Alberto Gorbatt (born 1953 in Buenos Aires) is an architect at the Faculty of Architecture, Design and Urban Planning at the University of Buenos Aires.

Biography 
In 1996, Gorbatt founded ARQA, the first Open Community of Architecture, Design and Construction in Latin America.

Editorial, curatorial and institutional experience 
 Director of ARQA in Argentina, Bolivia, Ecuador, México, Paraguay, Peru and Uruguay
 Director of ARQADIA AMERICA, a program for the selection and promotion of new generations of architects and designers in the Americas (a program of the Pan-American Federation of Architecture Associations (FPAA)) 
 Director General of the Argentina International Biennial of Architecture (BIA-AR)
 Director General of the Uruguay International Biennial of Architecture (BIA-UY)
 Editor of SCALAE, and Argentine architectural journal
 Director of the ARQA Encuentros de Arquitectura [Architecture Conferences]''
 Member of the Oversight Commission of the Argentine Central Society of Architects (SCA)

References

External links 
 ARQA (http://arqa.com/)
 ARQADIA AMERICA (http://arqadia.org/)
 BIA-AR (https://web.archive.org/web/20150417002009/http://biaar.com/)

1953 births
Living people
Architects from Buenos Aires
Academic staff of the University of Buenos Aires